WQED may refer to:

WQED (TV), a television station (channel 13 virtual 4 digital) licensed to Pittsburgh, Pennsylvania, United States
WQED-FM, a radio station (89.3 FM) licensed to Pittsburgh, Pennsylvania, United States
 The stations' parent company, WQED Multimedia, or their production facility at 4802 Fifth Avenue in Pittsburgh's Oakland neighborhood.

See also 

 
 KQED (disambiguation)
 QED (disambiguation)